The Wyndham is a historic apartment building located at Indianapolis, Indiana.  It was built in 1929, and is a seven-story, four bay wide, Tudor Revival style multicolor brick building.  It features a recessed central entrance with pointed limestone arch, intricately detailed oriel window at the second and third floors, and a parapet with four blind trefoil arches.

By the time the current owner, Pearl Companies, bought the building for $1.4 million in 2015, the building had deteriorated to the point that it was almost vacant. Pearl spent $5.7 million for renovations. Originally the building contained 48 apartments, which Pearl reduced to 37 to increase the floor space for each unit. The doorways for the former units, as well as other interior details, were retained.

It was listed on the National Register of Historic Places in 1983.

References

Apartment buildings in Indiana
Residential buildings on the National Register of Historic Places in Indiana
Tudor Revival architecture in Indiana
Residential buildings completed in 1929
Residential buildings in Indianapolis
National Register of Historic Places in Indianapolis